"War with God" is a song on the album Release Therapy by rapper Ludacris. Released in July 2006, the song saw Ludacris return to music after some time off to concentrate on his acting career.

Synopsis
In the track, Ludacris goes on the offensive against an unknown rapper who has sold drugs, makes repeated references to firing guns in his songs, isn't as rich as Ludacris, and likes to give himself titles; these allegations are directed toward T.I.

T.I. responds to this song on the remix of "Umma Do Me" by Rocko saying:

Money you say u get 30 mil. in six yearsListen, Forbes put me down fa 20, dat was dis yearAnd let's get dis clear just between you and meDat apology was for B.E.T not D.T.P

Ludacris has stated that the song was deeper than just a diss, and the song is more about him than anyone else, it's showing that he isn't just the 'cartoon entertainer' type rapper that he has been portrayed as. When asked about who specific rhymes were aimed at, he said "The guilty will speak".

Later, in SOHH.com's Pre VMA Interview, Ludacris was asked if the song was self-referential. Ludacris replied, "Man, somebody misquoted me talking about...they misquoted me saying it was about me. What I was telling them was that I devote a lot of information about myself, and I think they're taking that in. I'm not battling myself on the record, that's ridiculous. What happens is you got a lot of people taking subliminal shots, but nobody ever says my name. I'm not for sure, so that record is like my way of taking subliminal shots right back. Don't get it misquoted, don't get it messed up. That's basically what it is man. It's like, you know, like I said I do devote a lot of information about myself on there. I started to wreck it up by saying I'm the best, and there's nothing you could do about it. [They say] I've never done this I've never done that, so you know when you look into it, it's a lot more records where it comes from on the album, September 26, Release Therapy, where it's the most personal album I've done. It's nothing but honesty so you can criticize it all you want to but at the end of the day you got to respect it cause I'm coming straight from the heart. [I'm] just telling the truth, [and] that's all you gotta know."

Credits and personnel

Recording
 Recorded at: The Ludaplex in Atlanta, Georgia.

Personnel
 Ludacris – vocals, songwriting  
 Dre & Vidal – producers, songwriting
 Don Cheegro – co-producer
 Alexander Chiger – songwriting
 Harry "Dirty Harry" Zelnick – songwriting, co-producer
 Joshua Monroy – recording
 Leon Huff – songwriting
 Kenny Gamble – songwriting
 Vincent Dilorenzo – mixing
 Phil Tan – mixing
 Michael Tsarfati – recording, assistant mixer
 Bernie Grundman – mastering

Samples
 Contains an excerpt of "War of the Gods", performed by Billy Paul and written by Leon Huff and Kenny Gamble.

References

Ludacris songs
Songs written by Ludacris
2006 songs
Songs written by Leon Huff
Songs written by Kenny Gamble
Songs written by Vidal Davis
Songs written by Andre Harris
Song recordings produced by Dre & Vidal